The Panasonic Lumix DMC-GM1 was announced October 2013, as Panasonic's "pocketable", Micro Four Thirds compact mirrorless interchangeable lens camera. It features the same sensor as the GX7, AF detection range of -4 - 18 EV, focus peaking mode, an electronic shutter with speeds ranging from 60 - 1/16,000 sec, and Wi-Fi connectivity.

Panasonic claims the camera is the smallest among interchangeable lens cameras.  It lacks some features found in competitors including a viewfinder, in-body image stabilization, a hotshoe, and NFC.

References

External links 
 Official Website
 Official Specifications
 First Impressions, DPReview
 Full Review, DPReview

GM1